"Wichita Lineman" is a song written by the American songwriter Jimmy Webb in 1968. It was first recorded by the American country music artist Glen Campbell with backing from members of The Wrecking Crew and has since been widely covered by other artists. It has been referred to as "the first existential country song".

Background and content
Jimmy Webb stated in an interview for the BBC Radio 4 Mastertapes programme that the song was written in response to a phone call from Campbell for a "place" or "geographical" song to follow up "By the Time I Get to Phoenix". Webb's inspiration for the lyric came while driving through Washita County in rural southwestern Oklahoma. At that time, many telephone companies were county-owned utilities, and their linemen were county employees.

Heading westward on a straight road into the setting sun, Webb drove past a seemingly endless line of telephone poles, each looking exactly the same as the last. Then he noticed, in the distance, the silhouette of a solitary lineman atop a pole. He described it as "the picture of loneliness". Webb then "put himself atop that pole and put that phone in his hand" as he considered what the lineman was saying into the receiver.

It was a splendidly vivid, cinematic image that I lifted out of my deep memory while I was writing this song. I thought, I wonder if I can write something about that? A blue collar, everyman guy we all see everywhere – working on the railroad or working on the telephone wires or digging holes in the street. I just tried to take an ordinary guy and open him up and say, 'Look there's this great soul, and there's this great aching, and this great loneliness inside this person and we're all like that. We all have this capacity for these huge feelings'.

Webb delivered a demo that he regarded and labelled as an incomplete version of the song, warning the producer and arranger Al De Lory that he had not completed a third verse or a middle eight. "When I heard it I cried," Campbell said, "... because I was homesick." De Lory similarly found inspiration in the opening line. His uncle had been a lineman in Kern County, California: "I could visualise my uncle up a pole in the middle of nowhere. I loved the song right away."

Webb's concerns over his song's shortcomings were addressed in the recording studio by adding a tremolo-infused Dano bass melodic interlude performed by Campbell, who had first made his reputation in the music industry as a session guitarist with the group of uncredited Los Angeles backing musicians known today as "The Wrecking Crew", many of whom played on the recording. One of them, bassist Carol Kaye, contributed the descending six-note intro. A second six-note bass lick improvised by Kaye was copied for strings by De Lory and used as a fill between the two rhyming couplets of each verse.

All the orchestral arrangements are by De Lory, who evokes the phrase "singing in the wire" using high-pitched, ethereal violins to emulate the sonic vibrations commonly induced by wind blowing across small wires and conductors, making them whistle or whine like an aeolian harp. Similarly, he employs a repeating, monotonic 'Morse code' keyboard/flute motif to mimic the electronic sounds a lineman might hear through a telephone earpiece attached to a long stretch of 'raw' telephone or telegraph line; that is, without typical line equalization and filtering ("I can hear you through the whine").

Webb was surprised to learn that Campbell had recorded the song: "A couple of weeks later I ran into [Campbell] somewhere and I said, 'I guess you guys didn't like the song'. 'Oh, we cut that,' he said. 'It wasn't done! I was just humming the last bit!'. 'Well, it's done now!'" After listening to the test acetates of the studio recording that Campbell had with him, Webb contributed the overdub of evocative, reverberating electronic notes and open chords heard in the intro and fadeout, respectively, of the finished track, played on his Gulbransen electric organ.

Structure
The song contains two verses, each divided into two parts. The first part is in the key of F major, while the second is written in D major. D represents the relative minor key to F, so a D minor (as opposed to major) section would be expected. The fact that it is nevertheless set in D major is argued to contribute to the unique and appealing character of the song.

The lyrics follow the key dichotomy, with the first part of each verse (F major) handling issues related to a lineman's job (e.g. "searchin' in the sun for another overload", "if it snows, that stretch down south won't ever stand the strain"), whereas the second part (D major) dwells on the lineman's romantic thoughts. Set off against the F major of the first part, the D major of the second part sounds distinctively mellow, which is consistent with its content.

Webb's melancholic, jazz-tinged chord progressions, laced with dissonant minor sevenths and suspended fourths, reinforce the song's indeterminate nature by modulating from F major to D major and back without ever fully resolving:

The song never does get ‘home’ again to the tonic – not in either verse, nor in the fadeout. This gorgeous musical setting suggests subliminally what the lyric suggests poetically: the lonely journeyman who remains suspended atop that telephone pole against that desolate prairie landscape, yearning for home.

Chart success and sales

Glen Campbell's version, which appeared on his 1968 album of the same name, reached number 3 on the US pop chart, remaining in the Top 100 for 15 weeks. It topped the American country music chart for two weeks and the adult contemporary chart for six weeks. It was certified gold by the RIAA in January 1969. In Canada, the single topped both the RPM national and country singles charts. In the United Kingdom, it reached number 7. , the song had amassed 357,000 downloads in the digital era in the United States.

Weekly charts

Year-end charts

Certifications

Accolades

In 2021, Rolling Stone magazine's list of the "500 Greatest Songs of All Time" ranked "Wichita Lineman" at number 206. British music journalist Stuart Maconie called it "the greatest pop song ever composed" and the BBC described it as "one of those rare songs that seems somehow to exist in a world of its own – not just timeless but ultimately outside of modern music". "Wichita Lineman" was spotlighted in series 12 of BBC Radio 4's Soul Music, a documentary series featuring stories behind pieces of music with a powerful emotional impact. In 2017, Paste placed the song at number two on their list of the 12 greatest Glen Campbell songs; in their version, Billboard ranked it number three.

The single was inducted into the Grammy Hall of Fame in 2000. In 2019, the song was selected by the Library of Congress for preservation in the National Recording Registry for being "culturally, historically, or aesthetically significant".

Personnel

Cover versions

Many adult "middle of the road" (MOR) artists recorded the song, including Tom Jones, Johnny Mathis, Robert Goulet, Andy Williams, Bobby Goldsboro and Engelbert Humperdinck, most of them shortly after the original version was a hit. There were also many instrumental versions, including one by José Feliciano. In 2001 the instrumental band Friends of Dean Martinez included a cover version on their studio album of the same name, featuring lap steel guitarist Bill Elm. Guitarist Johnny A included an instrumental version on his 1999 release Sometime Tuesday Morning. The song has also been covered by artists such as Ray Charles, The Dells, Billy Joel, Freedy Johnston, O.C. Smith, Willie Hutch, The Meters, These Animal Men, Maria McKee, Reg Presley of The Troggs, Sergio Mendes & Brasil '66, Kool & The Gang, Shawn Lee, Smokey Robinson and the Miracles, James Taylor, R.E.M., The Clouds, Earl Van Dyke, Zucchero Fornaciari, King Harvest, Johnny Cash,  Dwight Yoakam, Wayne Newton, Tony Joe White, Stoney LaRue, B.E.F., Urge Overkill, Black Pumas, Colin Hay and The Nottingham Youth Jazz Orchestra (Combo).

Jazz pianist Alan Pasqua developed an arrangement of the song for jazz trio that appears on his album My New Old Friend and Peter Erskine's album The Interlochen Concert. Jazz pianist John Harkins played an up-tempo rendition of the song on his 2015 album Cognition. Jazz pianist Laurence Hobgood recorded a version of the song combining a contemporary jazz trio with a string quartet. 
A soul-jazz version was also performed by Young-Holt Unlimited. A stripped-down version of the song also appears on Villagers' 2016 album Where Have You Been All My Life with a simple piano accompaniment. 

Other covers of the song include that of Wade Hayes, who released a version in August 1997 that peaked at number 55 on the US country music charts. It was to have been included on an album entitled Tore Up from the Floor Up, but due to its poor chart performance, the album was delayed. That album was finally released in 1998 as When the Wrong One Loves You Right, with the "Wichita Lineman" cover excluded.

In 2016, the country-pop band Restless Heart also recorded a cover of the song.

Guns N' Roses covered the song live during their "Not in This Life Time" world tour. The first live performance of the song was on August 30, 2017, in Edmonton, Alberta, Canada. Rolling Stone magazine described it as "their most unexpected cover of the tour".

The Brian Setzer Orchestra covered the song live during their Christmas Rocks! 2017 tour and they perform the song on the Christmas Rocks! Live Blu-ray DVD that was released on November 9, 2018.

After Campbell's death, Webb sang the song with Little Big Town as a tribute during the 51st Annual Country Music Association Awards on November 8, 2017.

Fred Hersch performed a cover of the song at the Village Vanguard on July 23, 2019.

Former Men at Work frontman Colin Hay recorded and released a version of this song on his 2021 cover album I Just Don't Know What To Do With Myself.

In other languages

Lyrics that are loose translations of, or inspired by, Webb's song have been written in at least two other languages: German and Finnish.
 
A German language version written by Thomas Fritsch, "Der Draht in der Sonne" (English "The Wire In the Sun"), has also been covered by Katja Ebstein.

Finnish singer Topi Sorsakoski recorded a Finnish version of the song on his album Yksinäisyys osa 2 in 1995.

In popular culture
The song was used in the opening and closing scenes of the Ozark season 2 episode, "Badger", to emphasize the setting and tone of the beginning and end of Darlene and Jacob Snell's romance.

Ron Swanson (Nick Offerman) can be heard briefly singing the song in the season four episode of Parks and Recreation, "The Debate".

Homer Simpson sings the song while mimicking hold music in The Simpsons 15th-season episode "Co-Dependents' Day".

The KLF referenced the song in the title "Wichita Lineman Was a Song I Once Heard", on their 1990 ambient house concept album Chill Out.

The Decemberists paid homage to the song on their album Picaresque in the song "The Engine Driver".

In the Newsradio Season 2 episode "In Through the Out Door", Matthew (Andy Dick) bets Joe (Joe Rogan) that the next song on the radio will be a good one. When they flip the radio on, "Wichita Lineman" is playing. Matthew admits to losing the bet, while from the next room Dave (Dave Foley) wistfully remarks that he loves this song.

The track's fadeout was voiced over for many years by longtime English DJ Steve Wright to close his BBC Radio shows.

Notes

References

Further reading

External links
Rolling Stone 500 Greatest Songs of All Time: Wichita Lineman
 Licensed lyrics of this song at SongMeanings

1968 singles
Songs written by Jimmy Webb
Glen Campbell songs
Wade Hayes songs
Andy Williams songs
Tony Joe White songs
Music videos directed by Steven Goldmann
RPM Top Singles number-one singles
Capitol Records singles
Songs about Kansas
Country ballads
Pop ballads
Songs about cities in the United States
Songs about loneliness
Songs about telephones
1968 songs
United States National Recording Registry recordings
Grammy Award for Best Engineered Album, Non-Classical
Grammy Hall of Fame Award recipients
Calls